Bayelsa Queens is a Nigerian women football club based in Yenagoa, Bayelsa State, Nigeria. They play in the highest pyramid of women football in Nigeria. They have won three championships in the Nigeria Women Premier League in the year 2004, 2006 and 2007.

History 
Bayelsa Queens was founded by former governor, Diepreye Alamieyeseigha in year 2000. The NWFL board documents that the club was the first female club in Nigeria to have her preseason abroad in 2007.

The club is also known as Restoration Girls, a name motivated by the government of the state.

Results and fixtures

Legend

2022

Current squad 
 Squad list for 2019 season.

Honours 
 Nigeria Women Premier League - 2004, 2006, 2007, 2021–22
 Aiteo Cup - 2021
 Betsy Obaseki Women Football Tournament - 2021

References

Women's football clubs in Nigeria
Association football clubs established in 2000
Nigeria Women Premier League clubs
2000 establishments in Nigeria
Football clubs in Bayelsa State
NWFL Premiership clubs